The Superleague Formula round France is a round of the Superleague Formula. Circuit de Nevers Magny-Cours hosted the first French event in 2009, and again in 2010.

Winners

References

External links
 Superleague Formula Official Website
 V12 Racing: Independent Superleague Formula Fansite Magazine

France